Gleneve Taletia Grange (born 6 July 1995) is a Jamaican athlete specialising in the shot put. She represented her country at the 2017 World Championships without qualifying for the final.

Her personal bests in the event are 17.29 metres outdoors (Atlanta 2017) and 16.54 metres indoors (South Bend 2017).

International competitions

References

1995 births
Living people
Jamaican female shot putters
World Athletics Championships athletes for Jamaica
Sportspeople from Kingston, Jamaica
Florida State Seminoles women's track and field athletes
Competitors at the 2018 Central American and Caribbean Games
20th-century Jamaican women
21st-century Jamaican women